Henri Adrien Marie Verbrugghen (1 August 187312 November 1934) was a Belgian musician, who directed orchestras in England, Scotland, Australia and the United States.

Born in Brussels, Verbrugghen made his first appearance as a violinist when only eight years old, and was a successful student at the Brussels Conservatorium under Hubay and Ysaÿe, winning many prizes. He visited England with Ysaÿe in 1888, and in 1893 settled in Scotland as a member of the Scottish Orchestra. During the summer he led the orchestra at Llandudno under Jules Riviere. For a time he was a member of the Lamoureux Orchestra at Paris and then for three years was deputy-conductor at Llandudno. He was director of music for four years at Colwyn Bay, and then returned to the Scottish Orchestra.

In 1902 he became leader and deputy-conductor under Frederic Cowen, and during the promenade season led the Queen's Hall Orchestra for three years.

In 1907, he was the soloist in the first performance in England of the Violin Concerto in D minor by Jean Sibelius.

He became chief violin professor at the Athenaeum, Glasgow, and in 1911 succeeded Dr Coward as conductor of the Glasgow Choral Union. In April 1914 he enhanced his growing reputation when a Beethoven Festival was held at London, Verbrugghen "conducting throughout the festival with insight and masterly ability" (The Musical Times, 1 June 1914, p. 399). Early in 1915 he was appointed director of the New South Wales State Conservatorium at a salary of £1,250 a year.

Verbrugghen arrived in Sydney in the same year full of enthusiasm. He had a great admiration for English-speaking people but did not like the methods of their schools of music, and decided that the conservatorium at Sydney should be based on continental models. He got together a remarkably fine orchestra, including the other members of his excellent string quartet who had come with him. For six years Verbrugghen's influence on the musical life of Sydney was of outstanding importance, but the politicians had not realized that it is impossible to carry on work of this nature without financial loss. The orchestra was disbanded in 1921 and Verbrugghen, who had suffered much from worry, went to America for health reasons.

In 1922 he was a guest conductor of the Minneapolis Symphony Orchestra, and had such a brilliant success that he was given the position of permanent conductor. Efforts were made in Australia to persuade him to return without success. In 1927 he composed his Missa de Sancta Maria Magdalena for the choir of St Mary's Basilica in Minneapolis, which is still popular in various congregations in the Midwest which celebrate the Tridentine Latin Mass. In 1928, he was elected a national honorary member of Phi Mu Alpha Sinfonia fraternity, the American fraternity for men in music. In 1931 he collapsed at a rehearsal of his orchestra, and never completely recovered his health. From September 1933 he was chairman of the Department of Music at Carleton College, Northfield, Minnesota, and he died in 1934.

There is a Verbrugghen Street in the suburb of Melba in the Australian national capital, Canberra.  All the streets in the suburb are named after significant figures in Australian music. Verbrugghen Hall at the Sydney Conservatorium of Music in Sydney also commemorates his name.

References

Sources

Belgian conductors (music)
Belgian male musicians
Male conductors (music)
Belgian classical violinists
Male classical violinists
Academic staff of the Sydney Conservatorium of Music
1873 births
1934 deaths